Aleksandrs Roslovs (born 11 March 1983, in Latvia) is a Latvian retired footballer.

Career
After leaving Latvian club FK Auda, Roslovs joined Bornholm in the Danish amateur leagues, becoming the first Latvian to play in Denmark in the process.

For 2003, he signed for Hämeenlinna in the Finnish top flight, where he made 14 league appearances over two seasons.

References

External links
 

Latvian footballers
Association football defenders
Living people
1983 births
Sportspeople from Liepāja
FC Hämeenlinna players
Randers FC players
Ølstykke FC players
Fremad Amager players
Hellerup IK players
FK Auda players
Latvia under-21 international footballers
Expatriate men's footballers in Denmark
IF Skjold Birkerød players
Allerød FK players